The Taitao Peninsula (Spanish: Península de Taitao) is a westward projection of the mainland of Chile, with which it is connected by the narrow Isthmus of Ofqui, over which the natives and early missionaries were accustomed to carry their boats between the Moraleda Channel and Gulf of Penas. It is situated in the Aysén del General Carlos Ibáñez del Campo Region and a part of this peninsula is located inside the boundaries of Laguna San Rafael National Park. A southward incurving projection of the outer shoreline of this peninsula is known as Tres Montes peninsula, the most southern point of which is a cape of the same name.

Spanish explorers and Jesuits that sailed south from Chiloé Archipelago in the 17th and 18th centuries regularly avoided rounding Taitao Peninsula entering instead the Gulf of Penas after a brief land crossing at the isthmus of Ofqui. While attempting to pass Gulf of Penas in 1741 a storm caught HMS Wager making it wreck in Wager Island, Guayaneco Archipelago. Part of the survivors, including John Byron, were led into the Spanish settlements of Chiloé Archipelago by the Chono cheftain Martín Olleta through Presidente Ríos Lake.

Writer Benjamín Subercaseaux visited Taitao Peninsula in 1946 reporting to have seen footsteps and fresh human feces he thought indicated that indigenous Chonos, as known from the historical record, still existed.

As result of its difficult access and isolation the peninsula is largely unexplored.

Vegetation
The vegetation types of the peninsula vary. In the western fringes of the peninsula, towards Tres Montes Peninsula, a shrubland of c. 2 meters high  Pilgerodendron uvifera and Nothofagus nitida grows. Amidst this shrubland occasional peatlands and forest exists. In the central parts of the peninsula, including the shores of Presidente Ríos Lake, forests of Nothofagus betuloides and Drimys winteri is to be found. Cushion peatlands of Donatia fascicularis and Oreobolus obtusangulus occupy the higher mountains of the peninsula. In the east near San Rafael Lake a Nothofagus betuloides forest with an understory of Desfontainia fulgens, Blechnum magellanicum, Fuchsia magellanica and Raukaua laetevirens grow.

Geology

Near the peninsula lies the Chile Triple Junction where the tectonic plates of Antarctica, South America and Nazca meets. Taitao ophiolite and other geological features are associated to the triple junction. As the Chile Rise has subducted beneath the South American Plate at Taitao Peninsula it has caused an sequence of three ridge–continent collisions starting about 5 million years ago.

Sources

Bibliography

 
Peninsulas of Chile
Landforms of Aysén Region